Jambor is a surname. Notable people with the name include:

Agi Jambor (1909–1997), Hungarian pianist
John Leslie Jambor (1936 - 2008), Canadian geologist and mineralogist
József Jámbor (born 1957),  Hungarian high jumper
Lajos "Louis" Jambor (1884–1954), Hungarian-born American painter, muralist, and illustrator.
Milan Jambor (born 1975), Slovak footballer
Nikola Jambor (born 1995), Croatian footballer